Ernst Stavro Blofeld is a fictional character and villain from the James Bond series of novels and films, created by Ian Fleming. A criminal mastermind with aspirations of world domination, he is the archenemy of the British Secret Service agent James Bond. Blofeld is head of the global criminal organisation SPECTRE and is commonly referred to by the codename Number 1 within this organisation. The character was originally written by Fleming as a physically massive and powerfully built man, standing around 6' 3" (1.90 m) and weighing 20 st (280 lbs, 127 kg), who had become flabby with a huge belly.

The most recurring antagonist in the franchise, Blofeld appears or is heard in three novels: Thunderball, On Her Majesty's Secret Service; and You Only Live Twice; as well as eight films from Eon Productions: From Russia with Love (1963), Thunderball (1965), You Only Live Twice (1967), On Her Majesty's Secret Service (1969), Diamonds Are Forever (1971), possibly For Your Eyes Only (1981; the pre-title sequence of which shows an unnamed character resembling Blofeld fall to his death), Spectre (2015) and No Time to Die (2021). The latter two films are set in a rebooted continuity, which started with Casino Royale (2006). Blofeld also appears in Never Say Never Again (1983), a remake of Thunderball that was not produced by Eon.

Blofeld has been played on-screen by Donald Pleasence, Telly Savalas, Charles Gray, Max von Sydow and Christoph Waltz, among others. It was initially a convention of the films not to show Blofeld's face, only a close-up of his hands stroking his white, blue-eyed Persian cat. His face is revealed in You Only Live Twice when he introduces himself to Bond for the first time in person.

Many of Blofeld's characteristics have become tropes in popular fiction, representing the stock character of the criminal mastermind, with the stroking of his white cat often retained as a parodic allusion to Blofeld's character. This can be seen parodied in the Austin Powers film series with the character of Dr. Evil and his cat Mr. Bigglesworth, or in the cartoons Inspector Gadget, with the character of Dr. Claw, and Danger Mouse, with the character of Baron Silas Greenback.

Character 
Ian Fleming includes information about Blofeld's background in his novel Thunderball. According to the novel, Blofeld was born on 28 May 1908 (which is also Fleming's birthdate) in Gdingen, Imperial Germany (now Gdynia, Poland); his father Ernst George Blofeld was Polish, and his mother Maria Stavro Michelopoulos was Greek, hence his Greek middle name Stavro. After World War I, Blofeld became a Polish national. As a young man, he was well-versed in the social science disciplines, but also in the natural science and technology disciplines. He first graduated from the University of Warsaw with a degree in Political History and Economics, and then from the Warsaw University of Technology with a degree in Engineering and Radionics. He was then hired by the Polish Ministry of Posts and Telegraphs and appointed to a sensitive communication position, which he used for buying and selling stocks at the Warsaw Stock Exchange.

Foreseeing World War II, Blofeld made copies of top-secret wires and sold them for cash to Nazi Germany. Before the German invasion of Poland in 1939, he destroyed all records of his existence, then moved first to Sweden, then to Turkey, where he worked for Turkish Radio and began to set up his own private intelligence organisation. During the war, he sold information to both sides. After the defeat of Erwin Rommel, he decided to back the Allied war effort, and was awarded numerous medals by the Allied powers after the war's end. Blofeld then moved temporarily to South America before founding SPECTRE.

In the John Gardner novel For Special Services, Blofeld is depicted as having had a daughter, Nena, with a French prostitute.

Although Fleming himself never confirmed it, it is generally thought that the character of Blofeld was based on real-life Greek arms dealer Basil Zaharoff. It is commonly believed that the name Blofeld was inspired by the English cricket commentator Henry Blofeld's father, with whom Fleming went to school. Henry Blofeld offered on the BBC Radio 4 series Just a Minute that "Ian took my father's name as the name of the baddie."

In novels 
Blofeld has three appearances in Ian Fleming's novels. He first appears in a minor role as the leader of SPECTRE in the 1961 novel Thunderball. The plot that he formulates is carried out by his second-in-command Emilio Largo. Blofeld is described physically as a massive man, weighing roughly 20 st (280 lbs, 140 kg), who had previously been a champion amateur weightlifter in his youth before becoming obese in middle age; he has black crew-cut hair, black eyes (similar to those of Benito Mussolini), heavy eyelashes, a thin mouth, and long pointed hands and feet. He has violet-scented breath from chewing flavored cachous (breath mints), a habit he adopts whenever he must deliver bad news. A meticulous planner of formidable intellect, he seems to be without conscience but not necessarily insane, and is motivated solely by financial gain. Blofeld's lifestyle is described in one chapter in Thunderball: "For the rest, he didn't smoke or drink and he had never been known to sleep with a member of either sex. He didn't even eat very much."

The novel Thunderball indicates that Blofeld wants to be a man of honour, or at least pose as one. During a meeting of SPECTRE agents, he refers to the kidnapping of a teenage girl, who was to be returned unharmed once her father paid the ransom. However, he refunded half the money after learning that she had been raped by her abductor, and he kills the agent responsible for this infraction by electrocuting him in his chair. This is the third instance in which Blofeld kills an operative for a breach of discipline; he had earlier shot one through the heart with a needle fired from a compressed-air gun, and strangled another with a garrote. In the movie Thunderball, Blofeld kills an agent for embezzlement rather than rape.

Blofeld is absent from the next novel, The Spy Who Loved Me, though its events take place while Bond is battling SPECTRE in North America. Perhaps less calculating than previously, he is notably saddled with the exploitable weakness of snobbery about his assumed nobility, indicating that he is losing his sanity. He is hiding in Switzerland in the guise of the Comte Balthazar de Bleuville and Bond defeats his vindictive plans to destroy Britain's agricultural economy (implied to be carried out on behalf of the Soviet Union). In the final sequence of the novel, Blofeld gets revenge by murdering Bond's new wife, Tracy.

In You Only Live Twice, published in 1964, Blofeld returns and Bond finds him hiding in Japan under the alias Dr. Guntram Shatterhand. He has once again changed his appearance. He has put on some muscle and has a gold-capped tooth, a fully healed nose, and a drooping grey mustache. Bond describes Blofeld on their confrontation as being "a big man, perhaps six foot three (190 cm), and powerfully built." It is indicated that Blofeld has by now gone completely insane, as he all but admits himself when Bond levels the accusation. Bond strangles him to death in a fit of rage at the end of the novel (something that he had done only once before, to Auric Goldfinger).

In both On Her Majesty's Secret Service and You Only Live Twice, Blofeld is aided in his schemes by Irma Bunt, who is clearly his lover in the latter, and posing as Shatterhand's wife. Bond incapacitates her in their Japanese castle base before it blows up, killing her.

The final mention of Blofeld is in the beginning of the next novel, The Man with the Golden Gun, published in 1965.

In films 

Blofeld's depiction in film influenced with great effect the depiction of supervillains and (together with that of Don Vito Corleone in The Godfather) that of Mafia bosses both in films and printed media, as, since his first appearance on the big screen in 1963, he established some "standards" imitated for decades, such as mysterious identities, being portrayed stroking a pet and with the face unseen by the spectator or the viewpoint character, and the concept of spectacularly executing underlings who fail to defeat the main protagonist.

Original timeline 
In the film series, Blofeld first appears in From Russia with Love (credited as "Ernst Blofeld", though the name is never heard), then in Thunderball (uncredited).  In these two appearances, his name is never spoken, his face is not seen, and only his lower body is visible as he strokes his trademark white cat.

Originally, On Her Majesty's Secret Service was to include the twist that Blofeld was Auric Goldfinger's twin brother, and would be portrayed by Gert Fröbe. However, this plotline was scrapped when it was delayed in favor of You Only Live Twice. Czech actor Jan Werich was originally cast by producer Harry Saltzman to play Blofeld in You Only Live Twice.  Upon his arrival at the Pinewood set, both producer Albert R. Broccoli and director Lewis Gilbert felt that he was a bad choice, resembling a "poor, benevolent Santa Claus."  Nonetheless, in an attempt to make the casting work, Gilbert continued filming.  After five days, both Gilbert and Broccoli determined that Werich was not menacing enough, and recast Donald Pleasence in the role – the official excuse being that Werich was ill.

In the third, fourth, and fifth appearancesYou Only Live Twice, On Her Majesty’s Secret Service and Diamonds Are Foreverhe is the primary antagonist, meeting Bond face-to-face. During the opening sequence of Diamonds Are Forever, Bond searches relentlessly for Blofeld and finds him overseeing the transformation of a henchman into a decoy duplicate, using plastic surgery. Bond drowns the decoy in a mud bath and kills Blofeld by shoving him into a volcanic pool, saying “Welcome to Hell, Blofeld.” After the credits, M tells Bond that now that Blofeld is dead, finished, he expects Bond to engage in “a little plain, solid work.” Of course, the man Bond killed turns out to be a duplicate.

In the film version of On Her Majesty's Secret Service, he is not Tracy Bond's (Diana Rigg) actual killer.  He drives the car from which Irma Bunt (Ilse Steppat) fires the fatal shots at Tracy, minutes after she had married Bond.

In a sixth appearancein the pre-credit sequence of For Your Eyes Onlyhe is an anonymous, bald, villain who uses a wheelchair and is trying to kill Bond once again. Blofeld remains unnamed and was listed in the film's end credits as "Bald-Headed Man with White Cat". The only clues to his identity are the trademark white cat, similar clothes to his previous onscreen appearances, the dialogue indicating he and Bond have met before, and the fact that the scene begins with Bond paying his respects at Tracy's grave, often considered by the producers as a means of providing an "immediate continuity link" in the event of a new actor taking the part of Bond (although this was Roger Moore's fifth appearance as Bond). The anonymity of the villain was due to the legal dispute between Kevin McClory and Eon Productions over the Thunderball copyrights.

Blofeld's appearance changes according to the personifying actor and the production. He has a full head of black hair in From Russia With Love and Thunderball; a bald head and a facial dueling scar in You Only Live Twice; a bald head with no scar or earlobes in On Her Majesty's Secret Service; and silver-grey hair in Diamonds Are Forever. This metamorphosing matches Fleming's literary portrayal of a master criminal who will go to great lengths to preserve his anonymity, including the use of plastic surgery. He often wears a jacket without lapels, based loosely either on the Nehru jacket or on the Mao suit, a feature which is used in spoofs like the Austin Powers series, though in his early two appearances on film he wears a black business suit.

Rebooted continuity 
By November 2013, Metro-Goldwyn-Mayer and the McClory estate had formally settled the issue with Danjaq and MGM and acquired the full copyright to the characters and concepts of Blofeld and SPECTRE. Blofeld consequently reappeared in Spectre, played by Christoph Waltz, and with a new background. In this continuity, he was born Franz Oberhauser, the son of Hannes Oberhauser (a character from the original short story "Octopussy", portrayed here in two photographs by Thomas Kretschmann), James Bond's (Daniel Craig) legal guardian after being orphaned at the age of 11, making him and Bond adoptive brothers. As a young man he resented Bond for being his father's favorite, leading him to murder his father, stage his own death, and take on the alias of "Ernst Stavro Blofeld", derived from his mother's lineage. Over time he assembled a global criminal organisation known as Spectre. Additionally, it is revealed that the villains of the previous Craig films – Le Chiffre (Mads Mikkelsen), Mr. White (Jesper Christensen), Dominic Greene (Mathieu Amalric), and Raoul Silva (Javier Bardem) – were all really working for Spectre. 

Bond encounters Blofeld while investigating a worldwide terrorist network, later revealed to be Spectre. Bond discovers that Blofeld is trying to take control of Nine Eyes, a global surveillance program, with help from treasonous Joint Intelligence Service agent Max Denbigh (Andrew Scott), and staging terrorist attacks in order to justify the program's existence. Bond and Madeleine Swann (Lea Seydoux), Mr. White's daughter, confront Blofeld at his desert base, where he gloats about being responsible for several tragedies in Bond's life, including the deaths of his lover Vesper Lynd (Eva Green) and the previous M (Judi Dench). He then tortures his former foster brother by strapping him to a mechanical chair programmed to surgically remove Bond's eyes. At the last second, however, Bond destroys the chair with an exploding watch given to him by Q (Ben Whishaw); the explosion destroys Blofeld's right eye and leaves him with a vertical scar running down the wounded socket. Nevertheless, Blofeld manages to escape. Bond ultimately foils Blofeld's plans and has the opportunity to kill him, but decides to spare his life, and Gareth Mallory (Ralph Fiennes), the current M, takes Blofeld into custody. 

Blofeld, again portrayed by Waltz, appears in the 2021 Bond film No Time to Die. He has been held in solitary confinement at Belmarsh prison for five years since his capture, but has been covertly running Spectre whilst feigning insanity. Blofeld has operatives steal the "Heracles" bioweapon and lure Bond to a meeting of high-ranking Spectre agents in the hopes of infecting and killing him. 

However, Blofeld's plan is sabotaged by Lyutsifer Safin (Rami Malek), whose entire family was murdered by Mr. White on orders from Blofeld. Safin has the bioweapon altered by rogue MI6 scientist Valdo Obruchev (David Dencik) so that it wipes out all the Spectre agents instead of Bond. Safin then coerces Swann to infect Blofeld with a strain of Heracles targeting his DNA. While attending Bond's interrogation of Blofeld, Swann unknowingly passes the bioweapon onto him before abandoning Safin's plan. Blofeld reveals he manipulated Bond into believing Swann had betrayed him five years earlier, resulting in Bond ending their relationship. Bond loses his temper and starts to choke Blofeld. The contact causes Blofeld to succumb to infection within seconds, and he dies shortly afterwards.

This incarnation wears a jacket without lapels and has a full head of hair, reminiscent of the Donald Pleasence, Charles Gray, and Telly Savalas versions of the character, respectively. His disfigurement later on the film echoes the scar and blind eye of Pleasence's version. He is also briefly shown with a white Persian cat, strikingly similar to the one from the Connery era films.

Table of film appearances

Comic books 
In the James Bond comic books by Dynamite Entertainment, Blofeld appears as the main antagonist in the Agent of SPECTRE arc, which ran between March and July 2021. As in the original Ian Fleming novels, he is the son of a Polish father and a Greek mother; his mother belonged to a family of Greek ship-owners, with Blofeld inheriting a private fleet from her, which he manages to build up into a global shipping empire. His base of operations is the (fictional) Greek island of Meraki. Behind his veneer of respectability as a shipping billionaire, Blofeld is the leader of the resuscitated SPECTRE global criminal organisation, which had been thought dismantled since the end of the Cold War.

Video games 
Blofeld appears in the end of the 2004 video game GoldenEye: Rogue Agent, with the likeness of Donald Pleasence, voiced by Gideon Emery. Despite the character being clearly him, as chief of an anonymous but powerful crime syndicate, he is not named because of the then-ongoing copyright controversy that also prevented the open usage of the character in the Moore era films.

Blofeld is a playable multiplayer character in the 2010 video game GoldenEye 007 for the Wii, with the likeness of Charles Gray.

Blofeld is one of the main characters in the 2012 Craig-era video game 007 Legends, featured in the mission based on On Her Majesty's Secret Service (set between Quantum of Solace and Skyfall), in which the character is an amalgamation of the first three actors appearing in the official film series. Throughout the game, he is voiced by Glenn Wrage. Legends, released prior to Blofeld's appearance in Spectre, portrays a feud with 007 that is not related to the film, thus rendering the video game non-canonical to the cinematic timeline.

Homages 
Some of Blofeld's characteristics have become supervillain tropes in popular fiction and media, including the parodies Dr. Claw (and his pet cat, M.A.D. Cat) from the Inspector Gadget animated series (1983–1986), Team Rocket leader Giovanni and his Persian from the Pokémon television series, and Dr. Evil (and his cat Mr. Bigglesworth) from the Austin Powers film series (1997–2002). The 1999 The Powerpuff Girls episode "Cat Man Do" also features a supervillain with a cat, though it is the feline that turns out to be the criminal mastermind. In The Penguins of Madagascar, the recurring villain Dr. Blowhole is a parody and homage to Blofeld. The rendition for Lex Luthor in Superman: The Animated Series, and to a certain extent, various entries of the DC Animated Universe, were derived in part from Telly Savalas' portrayal of Blofeld in On Her Majesty's Secret Service.  The character The Grand Master (and pet rabbit General Flopsy) from the CBBC series M.I. High (2007–2014) are heavily based on characteristics popularised in Blofeld.

In the fourth episode of the first season of Monty Python's Flying Circus in 1969, Eric Idle played Arthur Lemming, secret agent for the British Dental Association, who found himself up against the forces of The Big Cheese (Graham Chapman), a diabolical dentist who appeared out of a secret panel in the wall with a stuffed rabbit called Flopsy on his knee.

In 1987, an edition of Saturday Night Live presented a skit called "Bullets Aren't Cheap," featuring Steve Martin as a particularly penurious Bond. That evening's musical guest Sting portrayed a villain called "Goldsting," who wore a Nehru jacket and, like The Big Cheese, carried a stuffed bunny rabbit.

Similar to The Powerpuff Girls example, General Viggo (a white Persian cat) is the villain of the video game Fur Fighters, while his pet is a small mutant human named Fifi.

See also 
 List of recurring characters in the James Bond film series
 List of James Bond villains

References 

Bond villains
Characters in British novels of the 20th century
Fictional Austrian people
Literary characters introduced in 1961
Fictional characters with disfigurements
Fictional crime bosses
Fictional Greek people
Fictional mass murderers
Fictional patricides
Fictional Polish people
Fictional spymasters
Fictional terrorists
Fictional torturers
Male literary villains
Male film villains
Video game bosses
Action film villains
Film supervillains